Jonathan Rees-Williams (born 10 February 1949) is a British cathedral organist, who served in Lichfield Cathedral and St. George's Chapel, Windsor Castle.

Background
He was born in St. Helier, Jersey. He studied music at the Royal Academy of Music.

In 2004, he was arrested and in court he admitted five counts of indecent assault involving two boys, but denied a further 10 counts against boys and three against a girl. He was jailed for five years for the indecent assaults and a further three months, to run consecutively, for possessing 127 indecent images of children on two computers.

Career
Organ scholar at New College, Oxford 1969 - 1972
Acting organist at New College, Oxford 1972

Assistant organist:
Hampstead Parish Church
St. Clement Danes
Salisbury Cathedral 1974 - 1978

Organist of:
Lichfield Cathedral 1978 - 1991
St. George's Chapel, Windsor Castle 1991 - 2002

References

British people convicted of indecent assault
British classical organists
British male organists
Cathedral organists
1949 births
People educated at Kilburn Grammar School
People from Saint Helier
Living people
Alumni of New College, Oxford
Alumni of the Royal Academy of Music
21st-century organists
21st-century British male musicians
Male classical organists